Nirit Dudovich (נירית דודוביץ') is an Israeli physicist who is the Robin Chemers Neustein Professorial Chair at the Weizmann Institute of Science. Her work considers strong field light-matter interactions and the generation of attosecond pulses. She was elected Fellow of the American Physical Society in 2016.

Early life and education 
Dudovich was born in Jerusalem. In 1989 she joined the Israel Defense Forces in the Intelligence Corps, where she served until 1993. She was an undergraduate student in physics and computer sciences at Tel Aviv University. She moved to the Weizmann Institute of Science as a graduate student, earning both a master's and graduate degree. Her research focused on quantum coherent control. After graduating, Dudovich moved to the National Research Council Canada.

Research and career 
In 2007, Dudovich joined the faculty at the Weizmann Institute of Science. Her research considers strong-field light-matter interactions, with a particular focus on the dynamics at ultrafast timescales. To this end, Dudovich developed frequency-resolved optomolecular gating. She has considered two aspects of high harmonic generation, including ionisation and recombination. She has made use of attosecond physics to better understand electronic processes such as tunnelling.

Awards and honours 
 2003 Chorafas Foundation Award for Outstanding Achievement and the Gad Resheff Memorial Prize for Outstanding Achievements in Research
 2004 Weizmann Institute Women in Science Fellowship
 2012 IUPAP Young Scientist Prize
 2012 Israel Physics Society Prize for Young Physicist 
 2013 Krill Prize for Excellence in Scientific Research
 2015 Elected to the Israel Young Academy
 2016 Elected Fellow of the American Physical Society
 2017 Helen and Martin Kimmel Award for Innovative Investigation
 2019 Named one of the most influential women scientists in Israel

Selected publications

Personal life 
Dudovich is married with three children.

References 

1971 births
Israeli women physicists
Living people
Fellows of the American Physical Society